Chung Hyeon was the defending champion but chose not to defend his title.
Yūichi Sugita won the title defeating Marco Trungelliti 6–4, 6–2 in the final.

Seeds

Draw

Finals

Top half

Bottom half

References
 Main Draw
 Qualifying Draw

Singles
Chang-Sat Bangkok Open - Singles
 in Thai tennis